Charles de Chambrun (1827–1880) was a French politician.

Early life
Charles de Chambrun was born on January 14, 1827, in Paris, France.

Career
De Chambrun served as a member of the Chamber of Deputies from 1876 to 1880, representing Lozère.

Death
De Chambrun died on November 24, 1880, in Haudemont, France.

References

1827 births
1880 deaths
Politicians from Paris
Members of the 1st Chamber of Deputies of the French Third Republic
Members of the 2nd Chamber of Deputies of the French Third Republic